Mount Hartzell is a  mountain summit located in the Coast Mountains, in Joffre Lakes Provincial Park, in southwestern British Columbia, Canada. It is part of the Joffre Group, which is a subset of the Lillooet Ranges. The mountain's name was submitted by Karl Ricker of the Alpine Club of Canada to honor Carl A. Hartzell, an early settler and postmaster at Pemberton. The name was officially adopted on January 23, 1979, by the Geographical Names Board of Canada. Precipitation runoff from the peak drains into Joffre Creek and Twin One Creek, both tributaries of the Lillooet River. The mountain and its climate supports the Hartzell Glacier on the southeast slope, and the Matier Glacier on the northern slope.

Climate

Based on the Köppen climate classification, Mount Hartzell is located in a subarctic climate zone of western North America. Most weather fronts originate in the Pacific Ocean, and travel east toward the Coast Mountains where they are forced upward by the range (Orographic lift), causing them to drop their moisture in the form of rain or snowfall. As a result, the Coast Mountains experience high precipitation, especially during the winter months in the form of snowfall. Winter temperatures can drop below −20 °C with wind chill factors below −30 °C. The months July through September offer the most favorable weather for climbing Mount Hartzell.

Climbing Routes
Established climbing routes on Mount Hartzell:
   
 East Face -  with glacier travel

See also

 Geography of British Columbia
 Geology of British Columbia

References

Gallery

External links
 Weather: Mountain Forecast

Two-thousanders of British Columbia
Pacific Ranges
Lillooet Land District